Michel Basilières (born 1960 in Montreal) is a Canadian writer, best known for his 2003 debut novel Black Bird.

Background
Basilières, the son of a Québécois father and an English Canadian mother, grew up as an anglophone despite his French surname. He studied creative writing at Concordia University, but dropped out before graduating, and spent much of his adult life working in bookstores in both Montreal and Toronto.

Career
Black Bird was published in 2003 as part of Knopf Canada's New Faces of Fiction series of works by emerging writers. A comic, magic realist take on the October Crisis of 1970, the novel won the Books in Canada First Novel Award for 2004, and was shortlisted for the Stephen Leacock Memorial Medal for Humour and the Commonwealth Writers' Prize for Best First Novel.

Following his award win, Basilières was a freelance book reviewer for the Toronto Star, the National Post and The Globe and Mail, and taught creative writing at the University of Toronto.

His second novel, A Free Man, was published in 2015, and was a ReLit Award finalist in 2016.

References

1960 births
Living people
Anglophone Quebec people
Canadian male novelists
Writers from Montreal
Magic realism writers
21st-century Canadian novelists
Canadian literary critics
21st-century Canadian male writers
Canadian male non-fiction writers
Quebecers of French descent
Amazon.ca First Novel Award winners